Australian Christian College – Southlands is a co-educational school, located in Albany, Western Australia. The school has grades ranging from Kindergarten to Year 12. As of 2013, Year 12 students will be able to complete their WACE at the school.

Vision
The school's vision is to develop students who are equipped spiritually, academically, socially and physically to be a positive influence on the world.

Associations
The school is owned and operated by Christian Education Ministries Ltd  and is a member of the Association of Independent Schools of Western Australia.

Principal
Malcolm Bromhead assumed the role in late 2014, having previously worked as principal of a fast-growing Christian school in New South Wales. The school has grown to approximately 570 students. In 2012, the school campus was upgraded with classrooms renovated and extensive landscaping occurring.

Student locations
Most students that attend the school reside in Albany, Mt Barker, Denmark, Youngs, Manypeaks and surrounds. In addition, the school offers distance education to students who reside across Western Australia.

Christianity
Enrolment is open to Christian students of all denominations as well as non-Christian students.

Australian Christian College – Southlands is one of nine Australian Christian Colleges located in Australia.

References

External links
Official school website
Christian Education Ministries Ltd
Association of Independent Schools of Western Australia

Nondenominational Christian schools in Western Australia
Southlands
Educational institutions established in 2006
Buildings and structures in Albany, Western Australia
2006 establishments in Australia